Paulacarellus is a genus of mites in the family Acaridae.

Species
 Paulacarellus faini Klimov, 2001
 Paulacarellus insularis Fain, 1976

References

Acaridae